Gymnoderma is a genus of lichen-forming fungi in the family Cladoniaceae. It has three species. The genus was circumscribed by Finnish botanist William Nylander in 1860. Nylander assigned Gymnoderma coccocarpum as the type species in 1869; this species was originally collected from the Himalayas. It occurs throughout southeastern Asia.

Species
Gymnoderma coccocarpum 
Gymnoderma favosum 
Gymnoderma insulare 

Some species once classified in Gymnoderma have since been transferred to other genera. These include:

Gymnoderma lineare  = Cetradonia linearis
Gymnoderma melacarpum  = Neophyllis melacarpa
Gymnoderma rugosum  = Stereum rugosum

References

Cladoniaceae
Lecanorales genera
Lichen genera
Taxa named by William Nylander (botanist)
Taxa described in 1860